Peralta may refer to:

Places
 Peralta, Navarre, village in the South of Navarre, Spain
 Peralta, New Mexico, village, United States
 Peralta (Mesoamerican site), pre-Columbian Mesoamerican archaeological site in the state of Guanajuato, Mexico
 Peralta Villa, Oakland, California, neighborhood of Oakland, California, United States
 The Peralta Community College District, in the East Bay, California, United States
 Peralta Rancho San Antonio, rancho in the East Bay, California, United States

Other uses
 Peralta (surname)
 Peralta (ferry), a 1930s San Francisco ferry whose hull is now part of the Kalakala
 SS Peralta, a concrete oil tanker, converted to a breakwater
 Peralta land grant, a forgery created by James Reavis who claimed title to much of Arizona and New Mexico.
 Peralta Home, the first brick house built in Alameda County, San Leandro, California. 
 Peralta Stones, Stone tablets that are alleged to be a map to the Lost Dutchman's Gold Mine.
 Giraffa camelopardalis peralta, the West African Giraffe